UCHealth Medical Center of the Rockies, located in Loveland, Colorado, is the sister hospital of Poudre Valley Hospital in Fort Collins, Colorado. Both are operated by UCHealth. The hospital is home to a regional heart center where open heart surgery is performed; a regional neurosciences center that cares for victims of head and back injury, stroke, spinal cord and nervous system diseases, as well as several neurosurgical intensive care beds.

History
Medical Center of the Rockies opened to patients on Valentine's Day 2007, to relieve crowding in Poudre Valley Hospital, and provide better access to patients from outside of Fort Collins, Larimer County, and even the state of Colorado. Poudre Valley Hospital did not close as a result of the new hospital's opening, but downgraded its trauma center from a state approved level II to an also approved level III and now focuses much more on orthopedic care, and cancer treatment than MCR.

Facilities
The hospital has 187 private rooms and offers a range of services such as neurosurgery, cardiac catheterization and open-heart surgery.

References

External links
 

Hospital buildings completed in 2007
Hospitals in Colorado
Buildings and structures in Larimer County, Colorado
Trauma centers